Pudur is a village and gram panchayat in Palakkad district, Kerala, India.

Demographics 
 India census, Pudur had a population of 5,798 with 2,994 males and 2,804 females.

References 

Villages in Palakkad district
Gram panchayats in Palakkad district